Richard Sánchez Alcaraz (born 5 April 1994) is a professional footballer who plays as a goalkeeper for USL Championship side Hartford Athletic. Born in the United States, he represented the Mexico national under-21 team.

Youth
Born in Mission Hills, California, Sánchez is of Mexican-American heritage. He moved to Dallas, Texas and started playing with Texas Football Club before joining Atlético Madrid in Spain. In 2009, he moved back to Dallas and joined the FC Dallas Academy. Sánchez briefly attended Little Elm High School in Little Elm, Texas.

Professional career

FC Dallas
Sánchez signed a professional contract with FC Dallas of Major League Soccer in February 2011, becoming their sixth homegrown player. Despite failing to make an appearance (other than in MLS Reserve League games), he signed an extension following the 2012 season.

Fort Lauderdale Strikers (loan)
In July 2013, Sánchez was loaned to the Fort Lauderdale Strikers of the North American Soccer League for the remainder of the season. He made his professional debut for the Strikers on 3 August. He started all 14 games in goal for the Strikers in the Fall season and kept three clean sheets.

Tigres UANL
In June 2014, Sánchez was sold to Tigres UANL. He made his debut as a substitute in a friendly against the San Antonio Scorpions. Soon after joining Tigres, he was briefly loaned back to FC Dallas before returning to Tigres in September 2014.

Chicago Fire
After a series of loans away from Tigres, Sánchez was released in the summer of 2017. He signed with the Chicago Fire in August 2017.

Sporting Kansas City
On 26 November 2019, Sánchez was selected by Sporting Kansas City in Stage 1 of the 2019 MLS Re-Entry Draft. On 9 December 2020 his contract option was declined.

North Texas SC
On 22 April 2021, Sánchez joined USL League One side North Texas SC ahead of the 2021 season.

LA Galaxy
On 18 January 2022, Sánchez signed a one-year deal with LA Galaxy as a free agent.

Hartford Athletic
On 3 Januiary 2023, Sánchez moved to USL Championship side Hartford Athletic.

International career
Sánchez became a key figure for Mexico's under-17 team at the 2011 FIFA U-17 World Cup. He became first choice goalkeeper under coach Raul Gutierrez, and started all seven games. He and his teammates were the first nation to win the tournament on home soil. He kept two clean sheets during the tournament including in the final. He later played with the Mexico under-20 team as first choice goalkeeper in the 2013 FIFA Under-20 World Cup in Turkey.

Career statistics

Club

Honours
Mexico Youth
FIFA U-17 World Cup: 2011
CONCACAF U-20 Championship: 2013

Individual
CONCACAF U-20 Championship Best XI: 2013
CONCACAF U-20 Championship Golden Glove: 2013

Personal life
Sánchez's wife is Christina Murillo, also a footballer who, like him, was born in the United States, but has represented Mexico internationally at the U17, U20 and Senior levels. She currently works for Chicago Fire FC.

References

1994 births
Living people
Mexican footballers
FC Dallas players
Fort Lauderdale Strikers players
Tigres UANL footballers
Chicago Fire FC players
Sporting Kansas City players
North Texas SC players
LA Galaxy players
LA Galaxy II players
Hartford Athletic players
Association football goalkeepers
Soccer players from Texas
North American Soccer League players
Major League Soccer players
Mexico youth international footballers
Mexico under-20 international footballers
American sportspeople of Mexican descent
American soccer players
Soccer players from California
Homegrown Players (MLS)
USL Championship players